The Second Representative Assembly of Pondicherry Deuxième Assemblée Représentative de Pondichéry (9 September 1959 - 30 June 1963) succeeded the First Representative Assembly of Pondicherry and was constituted after the victory of Indian National Congress (INC) and its ally in the 1959 assembly election held between 11 to 14 August 1959.

Background
The First Representative Assembly of Pondicherry which was constituted in 1955 after 1955 Pondicherry Representative Assembly election.  However, that government was not stable as the ruling party was ridden with personal strifes and factions. The Government of India had to intervene finally by dissolving the Assembly following the instability caused by the change of party affiliation of members. Then, the Chief Commissioner took over the administration in October 1958. Later, after nine months, second general elections were held to the Pondicherry Representative Assembly in 1959.

Important members
 President:
A.S. Gangeyan from September 1959 to 30 June 1963
 Leader of the House:
 V. Venkatasubba Reddiar from  9 September 1959 to 30 June 1963
 Leader of opposition:
 V. Subbiah from  September 1959 to 30 June 1963

Members of the 2nd Pondicherry Representative Assembly

Keys:

Council of ministers of Reddiar (1959-1963)
Under supervision of then chief commissioner L.R.S Singh a Council of ministers was formed under leadership of V. Venkatasubba Reddiar: on 9 September 1959. President of the assembly that is equivalent to speaker was A. S. Gangeyan.

As on 20 April 1962 the composition of ministry of Venkatasubba Reddiar was as follows:

Council of ministers of Goubert (1963-1964)
The French settlements of India were de jure transferred on 16 August 1962. Pondicherry Representative Assembly functioned until June 30, 1963 and succeeded by Puducherry Legislative Assembly. The Indian Parliament enacted the Government of Union Territories Act, 1963 that came into force on 1 July 1963, and the pattern of Government prevailing in the rest of the country was introduced in this territory also, but subject to certain limitations. Edouard Goubert became the chief minister in the subsequent Pondicherry Legislative Assembly.

In the First Legislative Assembly of Pondicherry, under supervision of then chief commissioner S.K. Datta  a Council of ministers was formed under leadership of Édouard Goubert: on 1 July 1963. Speaker was A. S. Gangeyan.

See also 
Government of Puducherry
List of Chief Ministers of Puducherry
List of lieutenant governors of Puducherry
Puducherry Legislative Assembly
Pondicherry Representative Assembly
1959 Pondicherry Representative Assembly election

References

Notes

Puducherry Legislative Assembly
Puducherry
1959 establishments in Pondicherry
1963 disestablishments in India